The Australian lace-lid (Ranoidea dayi) is a species of tree frog in the subfamily Pelodryadinae. It is endemic to the wet tropics of north-eastern Queensland, Australia.

Description
The dorsal surface is rich-brown to orange-brown with or without scattered cream or lichen-like spots and blotches covering it, the head or the limbs. The arms and legs have faint barring and a slight fringe along the outer edges. The belly is cream-white and granular, with the throat and under surface of the arms and legs being black. The iris is dark brown and the pupil is vertical when constricted. The lower eyelid is patterned with lines, veins, and dots which give the frog its name. Toes are fully webbed and fingers are almost completely webbed. The tympanum is distinct with the upper quarter cover under a skin fold.

Ecology and behaviour
This species ranges from Paluma to Cooktown in northern Queensland. But can also be found around slower watercourses and rock soaks when ample vegetation is present. They breed from spring to summer with peak breeding occurring from October to April. Males call while on low foliage or rocks close to the stream, and have has two distinct calls. A drawn-out "eeeeeeee" repeated three or four times in concession is made when calling in a group and when calling alone a short "ee" is made every 4–5 seconds. Eggs are large and unpigmented and are laid in clumps of up to 100 attached to submerged objects.

Similar species

It may be confused with the fringed tree frog which is readily distinguished by the vertical pupil and the lower eyelid patterning.

Conservation status
It is listed as Endangered under both the IUCN Red List and Queensland's Nature Conservation Act 1992.

References

Additional sources
 Department of Environment and Heritage - Lace-eyed Tree Frog
 Frogs Australia Network - call available here
Barker, J.; Grigg, G.C.; Tyler,M.J. (1995). A Field Guide to Australian Frogs. Surrey Beatty & Sons.

Amphibians of Queensland
Endangered fauna of Australia
Nature Conservation Act endangered biota
Ranoidea (genus)
Amphibians described in 1897
Taxa named by Albert Günther
Frogs of Australia